Poonam Kaur is an Indian actress and model who primarily appears in Telugu and Tamil films. She is also a politician, based out of Telangana and a member of the Congress Party.

Career 
Born and raised in Hyderabad, India, Poonam Kaur did her schooling in Hyderabad Public School, before doing fashion designing at the National Institute of Fashion Technology (NIFT) in Delhi. In 2006, after her studies, she signed up for a film to be directed by Teja, which didn't take off for unknown reason. However, she took an offer for another Teja film, Oka Vichitram. Even before the release of that film, Kaur was pursuing a lead role in another Telugu film, Mayajalam, which released first.

Subsequently, she appeared in several Telugu films as Nikki And Neeraj, enacting the title role of Nikki, and in Souryam, alongside Gopichand and Anushka Shetty. For her performance in the latter, Kaur received a nomination for the Best Supporting Actress Award for 2008. She made her acting debut in the Tamil and Kannada film industries, with S. A. Chandrasekhar's Nenjirukkum Varai and Bandhu Balaga, respectively. In 2010, she made a comeback in Tamil with the highly anticipated Unnaipol Oruvan, a remake of the 2008 Bollywood film, A Wednesday!, in which she played a small supporting role alongside Kamal Haasan and Mohanlal. Recently, she was nominated as a brand ambassador for the Miss Telangana event.

Filmography

Television

References

External links 
 

Living people
Year of birth missing (living people)
Actresses from Hyderabad, India
Punjabi women
Indian Sikhs
Indian film actresses
Indian television actresses
Actresses in Hindi cinema
Actresses in Telugu cinema
Actresses in Tamil cinema
Actresses in Kannada cinema
Actresses in Malayalam cinema
Actresses in Telugu television
21st-century Indian actresses